Terry Kiser (born August 1, 1939) is an American actor. Besides portraying the deceased title character of the comedy Weekend at Bernie's and its sequel, Weekend at Bernie's II, he has more than 140 acting credits to his name, with a career spanning more than 50 years. He is the co-founder of the now defunct acting school The Actors Arena in Austin, Texas.

Early life and education
He attended the University of Kansas, where he received a football scholarship. He graduated in 1962 with a degree in industrial engineering. 

A few years later, on the advice of a drama teacher, he made the decision to quit his engineering profession in order to pursue acting full-time and moved to New York City in 1965. He joined the Actors Studio and worked with Lee Strasberg.

Career

After college, Kiser returned to his hometown Omaha and worked as an engineer for three years while acting in amateur productions; more than 50 plays. His first two years in New York City included an array of small parts, ranging from theater to television to commercials.  By 1967, Kiser gained significant recognition for his work, winning both an Obie Award and Theater World Award for Fortune and Men's Eyes.

Becoming a life member of The Actors Studio, Kiser was a regular on several soap operas, The Secret Storm and The Doctors. In 1978, he starred on the short-lived sitcoms The Roller Girls, and Sugar Time!. It was during the 1970s and early 1980s that Kiser appeared in Three's Company, "Hardcastle and McCormick", One Day At A Time, The Love Boat, Night Court, 227, Maude and The Golden Girls. 

One of his roles was on the TV drama Hill Street Blues, playing comedian Vic Hitler ("Vic the Narcoleptic Comic"). He was a cast member on the syndicated sketch comedy show Off the Wall and a part of the ensemble on Carol Burnett's Carol & Company, which aired in 1990. In the 1990s, he appeared on Walker, Texas Ranger, The Golden Girls, The Fresh Prince of Bel-Air, Lois & Clark: The New Adventures of Superman (as H. G. Wells) and Will & Grace.

His film appearances include Fast Charlie... the Moonbeam Rider (1979), Rich Kids (1979), Steel (1979), An Eye for an Eye (1981), Making Love (1982), Six Pack (1982), Starflight: The Plane That Couldn't Land (1983), Surf II (1984), From a Whisper to a Scream (1987) and Friday the 13th Part VII: The New Blood (1988).

Kiser starred in Weekend at Bernie's (1989), in the title role of Bernie Lomax, the corrupt insurance executive who is dead for most of the film. Bernie's young employees, played by Jonathan Silverman and Andrew McCarthy, attempt to convince people that Bernie is still alive. He reprised the role in Weekend at Bernie's II (1993). Since 2012, several YouTube videos featuring "The Bernie Dance" generated more than 17 million views collectively by April 2016. Other film appearances include Mannequin Two: On the Move (1991), Into the Sun (1992), The Pledge (2011), and A Christmas Tree Miracle (2013).

In 2013, Kiser moved to Austin, Texas where he founded an acting school, The Actors Arena, which closed in 2016. Instruction was open to students of all ages and experience levels, and served approximately 300 students during its three-year run.

Filmography

Movies 

 Rachel Rachel (1968) as Preacher
 Lapin 360 (1972) as Bernard Lapin
 Fast Charlie... the Moonbeam Rider (1979) as Lester Neal
 Rich Kids (1979) as Ralph Harris
 Steel (1979) as Valentino
 Seven (1979) as Senator
 All Night Long (1981) as Ultra-Save day manager
 An Eye for an Eye (1981) as Dave Pierce
 Looker (1981) as Commercial Director
 Making Love (1982) as Harrington
 Six Pack (1982) as Terk Logan
 Surf II (1984) as Mr. O'Finlay
 Young Lust (1984)
 From a Whisper to a Scream (1987) as Jesse Hardwick
 Friday the 13th Part VII: The New Blood (1988) as Dr. Crews
 Weekend at Bernie's (1989) as Bernie Lomax
 Side Out (1990) as Uncle Max
 Mannequin Two: On the Move (1991) as Count Gunther Spretzle / Sorcerer
 Into the Sun (1992) as Mitchell Burton
 Weekend at Bernie's II (1993) as Bernie Lomax
 Tammy and the T-Rex (1994) as Dr. Wachenstein
 Pet Shop (1994) as Joe Yeagher
 Loving Deadly (1994) as Walter
 Forest Warrior (1996) as Travis Thorne
 Divorce: A Contemporary Western (1998) as Gary
 Flamingo Dreams (2000) as Gus
 See Jane Run (2001)
 Dead Start (2009) as Mort Maxwell
 Maskerade (2011) as Mr. Peck
 The Pledge (2011) as Joe
 Speed Demons (2012)
 A Christmas Tree Miracle (2013) as Henry Banks
 Spoilers: The Movie (2014) as Mr. Stoyanovich
 Almosting It (2016) as Mort

Television 
 The Doctors (1967) as Dr. John Rice
 Emergency! (1976) "Fair Fight" - Wes Hubbard
 Barnaby Jones (1976) "Eyes of Terror" - Arlie
 The Bionic Woman (1976) "Mirror Image" - Matthews
 Hawaii Five-O (1977) "Blood Money is Hard to Wash" - Augie
 All in the Family (1978) "Stale Mates" as Bob
 Maude (1978) as Reggie
 WKRP in Cincinnati (1979) as Mr. Elliot
 One Day at a Time (1979) as Parsons
 Three's Company (1981-1982) as Mr. Canon/Max
 Hardcastle and McCormick (1983)
 Hill Street Blues (1983) as Vic Hitler
 Night Court (1984) as Al Craven
 The Golden Girls (1986) as Santa Claus/Don
 Murder, She Wrote (1988) as Wally Bryce
 Carol & Company (1990-1991) as Terry
 The Fresh Prince of Bel-Air (1993) as Mr. Hosek
 Lois & Clark: The New Adventures of Superman (1995-1996) as H. G. Wells
 Caroline in the City (1997) as Taxicab Driver
 Walker, Texas Ranger (1997) as Charlie Brooks / Maxwell 'Iceman' Kronert
 ''The Norm Show (2000) as Councilman Wilkinson

References

External links
 
 
 
 

1939 births
American male film actors
American male television actors
Living people
Male actors from Omaha, Nebraska
20th-century American male actors
21st-century American male actors
University of Kansas alumni